Danity Kane is the debut album by American girl group Danity Kane. It was first released by Bad Boy and Atlantic Records on August 22, 2006 in the United States. After winning the third installment of the reality talent contest Making the Band in late 2005, Sean "Diddy" Combs and Bad Boy vice president Harve Pierre consulted a wide range of high-profile hip-hop and R&B musicians to work with the quintet, including Timbaland, Danja, Bryan Michael Cox, Rami, Ryan Leslie, Rodney "Darkchild" Jerkins, Scott Storch, and Jim Jonsin, as well as Bad Boy inhouse producers Mario Winans and D-Dot. Recorded within five weeks, the making of the album was tracked by the second half of Making the Band 3s third season.

Upon its release, the album earned largely mixed reviews from music critics, many of whom considered the album confident but found the material uneven or generic. A commercial success, Danity Kane sold over 109,000 copies in its first day of release, placing it at number one on the US Billboard 200. Having surpassed sales in excess of 935,000 copies by 2008, it was eventually certified Platinum by Recording Industry Association of America (RIAA) for over one million copies shipped domestically. In support of the album, Danity Kane released two singles, including the top ten hit "Show Stopper," and served as the singer Christina Aguilera's opening act during the North American leg of her Back to Basics Tour (2007).

Singles 
Jim Jonsin-produced "Show Stopper" featuring rapper Yung Joc was released as the album's lead single. It debuted at number 17 US Billboard Hot 100 in the week of September 2, 2006 and eventually peaked at number eight the following week. In Germany, the song debuted and peaked at number 27 on the German Singles Chart in November 2006, becoming the band's only top 40 hit there. "Show Stopper" was followed by the moderately successful single "Ride for You" which peaked at number 78 on the US Billboard Hot 100 only.

Critical reception

Danity Kane earned generally mixed review from music critic. Deepti Hajela from CBS News wrote that "Diddy's taking no chances  [...] And it pretty much pays off. While there are a few clunkers, and some clear filler, there are also some standouts." AllMusic rated the album three stars ouf of five and found that the band members "easily display enough sensuality and confidence to position themselves for competition in the pop diva big leagues." Rolling Stones Rob Sheffield wrote that "with producers like Timbaland, Rodney Jerkins and Jim Jonsin, Danity Kane are positioned to inherit the legacy of O-Town."  John Bergstrom, writing for PopMatters, argued that "instead of being eclectic or even disparate, Danity Kane is full of the clattering, mid-tempo, bass-heavy, spaced-out grooves that currently dominate mainstream hip-hop and "R&B." It sounds good as far as this type of thing goes. Every so often, the production is even interesting [...] But most of the rest runs from undistinguished to intolerable."

Commercial performance
Danity Kane debuted and peaked at number 1 on the US Billboard 200, selling 234,000 copies in its first week. This marked the highest chart opening as well as the biggest first week sales for any Making the Band season winner. On Billboards component charts, the album debuted and peaked number two on both the Top R&B/Hip-Hop Albums chart and the Tastemaker Albums chart – only behind Outkast's Idlewild (2006). On October 24, 2006, it was certified gold by the Recording Industry Association of America (RIAA), followed by a platinum certification a month later for the shipment of over 1,000,000 copies in the United States. In total, Danity Kane had sold 935,000 copies domestically by 2008. Elsewhere, Danity Kane entered the charts in Germany and Switzerland, peaking as number 50 on the German Albums Chart and number 95 on the Swiss Albums Chart.

Track listing 

Notes
 denotes co-producer

Personnel and credits 
Musicians

 Shannon Bex – lead vocalist
 Aundrea Fimbres – lead vocalist
 Aubrey O'Day – lead vocalist
 Dawn Richard – lead vocalist
 Yung Joc – guest vocalist
 Shay Winans – background vocalist
 D. Woods – lead vocalist

Technical and production

 Marcella Araica – engineer
 Chris Athens – mastering engineer
 Chapman Baehler – photography
 Jim Beanz – vocal producer
 Arnthor Birgisson – producer
 Cornell "Nell" Brown – recording engineer
 Noel Burdick – recording engineer
 Demacio Castellon – mixing engineer
 Candice Childress – production coordinator
 Sean Combs – executive producer
 Harve Pierre – executive producer
 Bryan-Michael Cox – producer, vocal producer
 D–Dot – producer
 Danja – producer
 Conrad Dimanche – vocal producer
 Mike "Daddy" Evans – production coordinator
 Jan Fairchild – engineering assistant
 Andy Geel – vocal producer
 Joe Gonzales – engineering assistant
 Andrew Haller – recording engineer
 Rodney Jerkins – mixing engineer, producer
 Jim Jonsin – producer
 Rich Keller – mixing engineer
 Ryan Kennedy – engineering assistant
 Kev–O – engineering assistant
 Kevin Krouse – mixing engineer
 Ryan Leslie – producer
 Rob Marks – engineer
 Gwendolyn Niles – A&R
 Mark Obriski – art direction, design
 Bill Pettaway – production coordinator
 Makeba Riddick – vocal producer
 Adonis Shropshire – vocal producer
 Sean Tallman – recording engineer
Timbaland – producer
 Sam Thomas – engineer
 Scott Storch – producer
 Supa And Tight Writer – vocal producer
 Rami Yacoub – producer
 Jeff Villanueva – engineer
 Kevin Wilson – engineering assistant
 Mario Winans – producer
 WyldCard – co–producer, vocal producer

Charts

Weekly charts

Year-end charts

Certifications

Release history

References

2006 debut albums
Albums produced by Bryan-Michael Cox
Albums produced by Danja (record producer)
Albums produced by Rodney Jerkins
Albums produced by Jim Jonsin
Albums produced by Timbaland
Albums produced by Rami Yacoub
Albums produced by Ryan Leslie
Albums produced by Scott Storch
Bad Boy Records albums
Danity Kane albums